Mungo  is a town and a  municipality in the province of Huambo, Angola. The municipality had a population of 113,417 in 2014.

References

Populated places in Huambo Province
Municipalities of Angola